The Javan trogon (Apalharpactes reinwardtii) is a species of bird in the family Trogonidae. The species was once lumped together with the Sumatran trogon in a single species, the blue-tailed trogon, but differences in size, weight and plumage have led to the two being split. These two species were once themselves lumped with the rest of the Asian trogons in the genus Harpactes, but have been split into their own genus due to differences in plumage.

The Javan trogon is endemic to western Java in Indonesia.

Its natural habitat is subtropical or tropical moist montane forests.
It is threatened by habitat loss.

References

External links
BirdLife Species Factsheet.

Javan trogon
Birds of Java
Javan trogon
Taxonomy articles created by Polbot